Natasha Méndez Bonelly (born May 29, 1990) is a professional triathlete, athlete and road cyclist from the Dominican Republic. She won the Dominican Republic National Time Trial Championships in 2016.

Career
Méndez was born in Santiago de los Caballeros.

2014
Méndez won the silver medal at the Dominican Republic National Time Trial Championships with a 35:49 time for the  course, and also won silver in the Dominican Republic National Road Race Championships, being defeated both times by the veteran Juana Fernández.

2015
Méndez competed in March in the World Triathlon Corporation series Ironman 70.3 in Monterrey, Mexico, with a finishing time of 4:49:23. She participated in the ITU event Ibarra CAMTRI Triathlon American Cup having a 29:30 swim before ending her race. Shortly after that, she won the silver medal in the Dominican Republic National Time Trial Championships, in a time of 31:55 and representing la Caya. She won the Olympic distance, local event at the Dominican Republic, the TRI Sports Summer Fest with a time of 2:14:32. By running the 5k category along with children and lending her image for the Casa de Campo Marathon, she supported the Hogar del Niño orphanage sponsored by local resort, located in La Romana, Dominican Republic.

2016
She started the year participating in the Ironman 70.3 in Panama, ranking in the 14th place in 4:35 and winning 80 points climbing to the 181 in the WTC world rankings. Méndez took the bronze medal in the SDQ 10k running competition held in Santo Domingo. In April she received the athlete of year award in Triathlon by the Santiago de los Caballeros Guild of Sport Writers, along with Jorge Manuel Díaz. Later, in May and June, she conquered the 19th place in Chattanooga and 11th place of Female Pros at Raleigh 70.3 both with a 4:51 time. She won the Dominican Republic National Time Trial Championships in June, after winning the 30k Mirador Sur Park course with a time of 30:59. She won the bronze medal in the Dominican Republic National Road Race Championships two days later, riding in Santiago de los Caballeros. In July, she competed the Budapest 70.3 in Hungary, finishing in 8th place in the Female PRO category and obtaining her first Top 10 finish, with a time of 4:34.

Major results

Cycling
Source: 

2014
 National Road Championships
2nd Time trial
2nd Road race
2015
 2nd Time trial, National Road Championships
2016
 National Road Championships
1st  Time trial
3rd Road race
2019
 3rd Time trial, National Road Championships

Athletics

2016
 3rd  5000 metres, Dominican Republic Military Games
2018
 Dominican Republic Military Games
3rd  10,000 metres
3rd  Half marathon

References

External links
 
 
 

People from Santiago de los Caballeros
Dominican Republic female cyclists
Dominican Republic female triathletes
1990 births
Living people